The Natricinae are a subfamily of colubroid snakes, sometimes referred to as a family (Natricidae). The subfamily comprises 36 genera. Members include many very common snake species, such as the European grass snakes, and the North American water snakes and garter snakes. Some Old World members of the subfamily are known as keelbacks, because their dorsal scales exhibit strong keeling.

Natricine snakes are found in Africa, Asia, Europe, North America, and Central America as far south as Costa Rica. A single species, Tropidonophis mairii, reaches Australia. Although the highest diversity is in North America, the oldest members are in Asia and Africa, suggesting an Old World origin for the group. Most species are semiaquatic and feed on fish and amphibians, although a few are semifossorial or leaf-litter snakes that feed on invertebrates. Most species are harmless to humans, but a few (e.g., Thamnophis sirtalis, Thamnophis elegans) are capable of inflicting bites that can result in local, nonlife-threatening symptoms, and at least two members of the genus Rhabdophis (R. tigrinus and R. subminiatus) are capable of inflicting life-threatening bites to humans, though they have only enlarged, ungrooved fangs in the back of the mouth.

Classification
They are recognised as a sister group of the Dipsadinae plus the Pseudoxenodontinae.

Genera

Afronatrix 
Amphiesma 
Amphiesmoides 
Anoplohydrus 
Aspidura 
Atretium 
Blythia  
Clonophis 
Fowlea 
Haldea 
Hebius 
Helophis 
Herpetoreas 
Hydrablabes 
Hydraethiops 
Iguanognathus 
Isanophis 
Limnophis 
Liodytes 
Lycognathophis 
Natriciteres 
Natrix 
Nerodia 
Opisthotropis 
Paratapinophis 
Pseudagkistrodon 
Regina 
Rhabdophis 
Rhabdops 
Smithophis 
Storeria 
Thamnophis 
Trachischium 
Trimerodytes 
Tropidoclonion 
Tropidonophis 
Virginia 
Xenochrophis

References

Further reading
Goin, Coleman J.; Goin, Olive B.; Zug, George R. (1978). Introduction to Herpetology, Third Edition. San Francisco: W.H. Freeman and Company. xi + 378 pp. . (Natricinae, p. 326).

Natricinae
Snake subfamilies
Taxa named by Charles Lucien Bonaparte